Rapid Fire is a 1992 American action film directed by Dwight H. Little and starring Brandon Lee, Powers Boothe and Nick Mancuso. The film was released in the United States on August 21, 1992.

Plot 
The film opens in Thailand, with Antonio Serrano, a mafia drug distributor visiting long-time associate Kinman Tau, a drug kingpin. Serrano is having troubles and wants them to work together, but his request is not reciprocated.

Turned off from politics after witnessing the death of his father at Tiananmen Square in China, Los Angeles art student Jake Lo is lured to a party of Chinese pro-democracy activists. While there, he witnesses Serrano killing party sponsor Carl Chang, who was an associate of Tau. When Serrano and his men attempt to kill Jake, he swiftly disarms them using martial arts techniques. Jake is placed under protective custody by federal agents, who coerce him into coming to Chicago and testifying against Serrano.

When the agents at the safe house are revealed to be corrupt, Jake escapes through the window and encounters a young police detective named Karla Withers. Withers' partner, Lieutenant Mace Ryan, helps Jake evade his pursuers and reveals that he had been pursuing Tau for 10 years.

Jake is persuaded by Ryan to help him exploit Serrano's FBI ties and obtain information about Tau's next shipment. Though the sting operation is successful, Jake is nearly killed in a barrage of gunfire and assaults Ryan after he reveals his involvement was not necessary. Later that night, Karla invites Jake to her apartment and shows him his father's confidential file. After an intimate discussion, they realize their feelings for each other and have sex. Meanwhile Ryan and his team lead a raid at the revealed location of the next shipment: Tau's laundry factory. Both the lovemaking and the events of the raid are shown alternately as they occur in actual time, culminating with Serrano being murdered in his cell by one of Tau's henchman.

Jake, Ryan and Withers subsequently team up to bring down Tau once more. Though Ryan and Withers are captured by Tau's men, Jake rescues them and eventually kills Tau at a train platform. He and Karla then evacuate Ryan from the burning factory and ride to the hospital together in an ambulance.

Cast 
 Brandon Lee as Jake Lo
 Powers Boothe as Lieutenant Mace Ryan
 Nick Mancuso as Antonio Serrano
 Raymond J. Barry as Agent Frank Stewart
 Kate Hodge as Detective Karla Withers
 Tzi Ma as Kinman Tau
 Tony Longo as Brunner
 Michael Paul Chan as Carl Chang
 Dustin Nguyen as Paul Yang
 Brigitta Stenberg as Rosalyn
 Basil Wallace as Agent Wesley
 Al Leong as Minh
 François Chau as Farris
 Quentin O'Brien as Agent Daniels
 Roy Abramsohn as Agent Klein
 C'Esca Lawrence as Lisa Stewart
 Michael Chong as John Lo
 Jeff McCarthy as Agent Anderson

Production 
Dwight H. Little's work had attracted the attention of Steven Seagal, but his usual studio partner Warner Bros. was reticent to hire the director of Halloween 4, a horror film. Seagal used a clause in his contract that enabled him to make one film for a different company, and set up Marked for Death at Fox, where Little was approved by studio boss Joe Roth. Marked for Death was a hit and established Little as an action director.

Interested in building up an action star of their own, Fox retained Little's services for a new vehicle starring Brandon Lee, whose name held great marketing upside, although Little found him to be a commandable actor as well. Director of photography Ric Waite and stage actor Basil Wallace, who played the main bad guy "Screwface" in Marked for Death, also returned.

The film's impetus came from producer Robert Lawrence, who had come across Lee's early Hong Kong feature Legacy of Rage. Its working title was Moving Target. Before Little was hired by Fox, John Woo was in talks to direct. According to Lee, the script was tailored for him, and he had access to screenwriter Alan B. McElroy from the get-go. Cindy Cirile, the wife and frequent collaborator of executive producer John Fasano, also contributed to the story. Paul Attanasio performed some uncredited rewrites. Nonetheless, Little was dissatisfied with the way the second antagonist was reintroduced later into the story, which he felt was anticlimactic and hampered the picture's reception.

Fox's PR campaign for the film used the motto "Brandon Lee, the Action Hero of the 90s", which the actor found overly emphatic, as he considered Rapid Fire to be his first legitimate starring role. While comfortable with his father's legacy, Lee saw the film as a springboard to mainstream success, and hoped to one day transition to a broader acting career akin to those of Johnny Depp or Mel Gibson. During the shoot, he met Raymond J. Barry, a respected stage performer and dramatist, and expressed interest in starring in one of his plays to build up his credibility. Barry was excited by the prospect, and too thought of Lee as a capable performer, beyond the obvious exposure benefits of casting him.

Due to Seagal's aikido techniques relying on using his opponents' own momentum against themselves, rather than raw aggression, Little felt that he had to build a traditional cop film atmosphere around them to maintain tension, whereas Lee's more kinetic style lent itself to a purer action film. Lee choreographed the action scenes in cooperation with stunt coordinator, personal friend and fellow Jeet Kun Do practitioner Jeff Imada Lee broke a toe during the shoot, which caused his foot to swell up and hamper his mobility. Some action scenes had to be switched around to accommodate his impairment while he healed.

Principal photography started on May 28, 1991 and was announced as completed on October 8, 1991. The prologue was shot on location in Thailand. The rest of the film was shot in the Los Angeles and Chicago areas, where it is set. The interior of the Chicago restaurant, where one of the film's larger setpieces takes place, had to be rebuilt on a Valencia, California set in order to film the collapse of its balcony.

Release

Theatrical
The film debuted at number 3 at the domestic box office. It finished its North American run with a US$ 14,4 million tally.

Home media
The film was released on VHS in the U.S. on February 24, 1993. It performed solidly in rental stores, cracking the top 10 of the Billboard charts, which analysts described as uncommon for a film led by a martial artist. Although there were reports of heightened interest in Lee's movies following his death while shooting The Crow, Rapid Fire spent seven weeks in the top 20, the better part of it unaffected by the media attention surrounding his untimely demise.

20th Century Fox Home Entertainment released the DVD in Region 2 in the United Kingdom on July 16, 2001, and Region 1 in the United States on May 21, 2002. Twilight Time released the film in a limited Blu-ray edition on August 21, 2018.

Reception
Stephen Hunter of the Baltimore Sun wrote that the film's fast pace, which he compared to video games, leaves Lee unable to show his charisma. Although he called the film a "disaster", Chicago Tribune critic Gene Siskel called Lee likable and appealing. Writing in the Los Angeles Times, Kevin Thomas described the film as "better than Enter the Dragon" and a star-making role for Lee. Stephen Holden of The New York Times said the film exploits the death of Lee's father, martial arts actor Bruce Lee, to make his character seem more sympathetic.

On Rotten Tomatoes, a review aggregator that includes both contemporary and modern reviews, it has an approval rating of 45% based on 22 reviews; the average rating is 4.86/10. Audiences polled by CinemaScore gave the film an average grade of "B+" on an A+ to F scale.

Aftermath
According to some outlets, the script Simon Says by Jonathan Hensleigh, which was eventually used for Die Hard with a Vengeance, had been considered for a sequel to Rapid Fire. However, no direct source is mentioned. Angela Bassett was projected to co-star as an African-American community activist. She remained under consideration as the film was being retooled into a Die Hard sequel, before the character was rewritten as a male and given to Samuel L. Jackson.
In 1995, Powers Boothe and Raymond J. Barry were reunited to support another martial arts actor, Jean-Claude Van Damme, in his vehicle Sudden Death. In that film, Boothe plays the villain, while Barry plays a virtuous U.S. vice president.
Dustin Nguyen met Brandon Lee's sister Shannon Lee on the set of this film, and would later work on the TV series she created based on Bruce Lee's writings, Warrior. However, his booking on that show owed more to his connection with its executive producer Justin Lin.

Soundtrack
The film's score was composed by Christopher Young. It was issued on CD and cassette by Varèse Sarabande at the time of its theatrical release. Young contributed an audio commentary of the film to its Blu-ray re-release, which also offers an isolated score track.
The soundtrack features two songs by hard rock band Hardline.

References

External links 
 
 
 

1992 films
American martial arts films
American action films
Cantonese-language films
1990s English-language films
1990s Italian-language films
American police detective films
Triad films
American neo-noir films
Kung fu films
Jeet Kune Do films
Gun fu films
Muay Thai films
Thai Muay Thai films
Mafia films
Films set in Chicago
Films set in Thailand
20th Century Fox films
Films scored by Christopher Young
Films directed by Dwight H. Little
1992 martial arts films
1990s American films
1990s Hong Kong films